Kathleen Ann Kelly (born 6 March 1961) is a singer, songwriter, and producer. Born in Leominster, Massachusetts, she is the third child of the musical family group The Kelly Family,  a multi-generational pop group that achieved success in Europe in the 1990s.

In 1999, Kathy released her first solo album titled The Best Of Kathy Kelly which, in addition to her best songs from the albums of The Kelly Family (see The Kelly Family discography), contained five new songs. While still recording and touring with the group throughout the 2000s, Kathy worked on her solo projects, which resulted in three more LPs up to date and a number of singles. Some of the songs included were new versions of the traditional songs from all over the world previously sung by the group from as early as the 1970s; notably "Amazing Grace", "Motherless child", "Old Black Joe", "The Rose of Tralee".

Biography

Early Years
Kathy was born in the US, on 1961. She is the third of five children born from the marriage of Daniel Kelly, Sr. and Joanne.

In 1965, her father and sister Caroline left the US to find a home in Europe. Papa Dan bought a home in Spain, close the city of Gamonal. Joanne and the other three children reunited with Dan and Caroline after some months.

In 1969, Dan divorced Joanne and married Barbara-Ann Suokko in 1970 in New York. Joanne returned to the US and apparently lost contact with Kathy. Barbara and Dan gave birth to eight other children.

Kathy was homeschooled, just like her elder and younger siblings, by Dan, Barbara and uncle Jim. She also learned ballet and to play the violin. Later, she was also the teacher of her younger siblings. Kathleen can also play the guitar, accordion, keyboards, piano among others.

The Kelly Family
 For more information, see: The Kelly Family 

In 1974, Kathy, Caroline, Paul, John and Patricia formed The Kelly Kids, to play at children's parties or in the streets. The band was later called The Kelly Family, as Dan and Barbara also joined, later followed by Kathy's siblings.

The Kelly Family became very popular in their early years as a street band. Kathy usually played the violin along with Paul, but when Caroline left, she started to play the accordion more frequently. Kathy was also the one who arranged most of the songs and she was the first of the siblings to write a song, as she is credited as the writer of Lonely, a song recorded in 1981 which features lead vocals from then-main vocalist John, and Papa Dan. She was also one of the main producers and has recorded most of the albums from the '80s until the late '90s.

As Danny, Caroline and Paul left after Barbara's death, in the early-to-mid '80s, Kathy remained with the family helping her father to raise the younger children.

In 1983, the family moved to France. There Kathy met her future husband Vincent van Hille. They married in 1990, and gave birth to Sean Jerome van Hille in 1992, but eventually divorced in 2001. Sean is named after Sean O'Kelley, the Kellys' ancestor.

In 1990 Daniel Kelly suffered a stroke which partially paralyzed him and left him bedridden. Though Dan remained fairly active in the 1990s, Kathy became the head of the group.

1994 was the year of the breakout for the Kelly Family, after the Kellys started to sell CDs on shops. Their CD Over the Hump sold 5 million copies. This was followed up by Christmas for All, Almost Heaven, Growin' Up, and From Their Hearts. In the last, Kathy's son, Sean, is also present doing vocals on "Dance to the Rock 'n Roll".

In 2000, Kathy Kelly officially left the band to pursue a solo career. Her last song sung for the band was By Myself but Not Alone with her brother John in 1999.

She is part of some of the band's most famous songs, for example: Peces en el Rio (1977, 1979, 1994), Amazing Grace (1981, 1990), Hiroshima, I'm Sorry (1985, 1988), When the Last Tree... (1993), Ares Qui (1994), Quisiera ser un Ángel (1995), Come Back to Me (1996), You're Losing Me (1998) and Children of Kosovo (1999).

She later returned to tour with the band from 2007 to 2008.

She also participated at Paddy Kelly's Stille Nacht Tour, along with Paul, Patricia, Joey Kelly, Michael Patrick Kelly and guest Caroline Kelly in 2011. Recordings of the concerts were taken and released in a live CD called Stille Nacht Live-CD 2011.

She also took part in the 2012 tour, called Stille Nacht 2012, and another live CD was released from the tour in September 2013.

In 2017, the Kelly Family reunited with seven members, and once again Kathy was part of the band. The Kelly Family released an album called We Got Love, on which Kathy sings six songs.

Overall, Kathy contributed to 32 out of 35 Kelly Family's albums and she provided vocals for 106 songs (including live CDs), only surpassed by Paddy and John.

Solo career
Kathy Kelly started her solo career by releasing a single called You're Losing Me that reached number 94 in the German charts. Soon, a compilation album called The Best of Kathy Kelly, which included some of the best Kelly Family songs and five new songs followed. It peaked at number 32 on the German chart and number 44 on the Dutch chart.

After leaving the Kelly Family in 2000, Kathy released another album, Morning of My Life, this time with whole new material. It peaked at number 22 of the German charts.

In 2002, Kathy released her third studio album, Straight From my Heart. In 2005, Kathy released her fourth album, called Godspel, which also features some songs with Jimmy Kelly.

Kathy also started a tour called Godspel Tour from 2009 to mid 2012 mainly in Germany, but also in Romania, Czech Republic, the Netherlands, Austria and Switzerland.

In September 2012, Kelly started a European tour through Germany and Romania.

In 2014, Kathy released a holiday album called My Christmas Songs and in 2015 an album called The First. Through this time she performed mainly at festivals and sporadic concerts. That year she did a tour with her siblings Paul and Patricia.

On 31 December 2015 and 2 January 2016, Kathy performed her first concerts in Bethlehem, Israel.

At the end of 2016, Kathy started a tour called Celtic Scottish Christmas Tour with her younger brother Paul.

In 2017, besides the Kelly Family comeback, Kathy continued her European Tour through the year, with one show also including her brother John Kelly.

Discography

For the recordings together with The Kelly Family see The Kelly Family discography.

Albums
 The Best Of Kathy Kelly (1999)
 Morning of My Life (2000)
 Straight From My Heart (2002)
 Godspel (2005)
 My Christmas Songs (2014)
 The First (2015)
 Wer lacht überlebt (2019) - German album

Singles
 "You're Losing Me" (1999)
 "Save Me in the Morning" (2001)
 "Nay No Nay" (2001)
 "My Last Goodbye" (2009)
 "Engelsmensch (Angel Love)" featuring Michael Kraft (2010)
 "You Sleep with Angels" (2012)

References

External links
 Official website of Kathy Kelly

1961 births
Living people
20th-century American singers
21st-century American singers
People from Leominster, Massachusetts
20th-century American women singers
21st-century American women singers